Wilhelm Löwinger (18 May 1916 – 18 January 2013) was an Austrian speed skater. He competed in two events at the 1936 Winter Olympics.

References

1916 births
2013 deaths
Austrian male speed skaters
Olympic speed skaters of Austria
Speed skaters at the 1936 Winter Olympics
Sportspeople from Vienna
20th-century Austrian people